Sampiro National High School is a Secondary Public High School located at Sitio Ugatan, Sampiro, San Juan, Batangas, Philippines (South west of brgy. Sampiro, South East of brgy. Sapangan, North West of brgy. Quipot,). It is a DepEd-recognized public high school.

History

Sampiro National High School was established through the initiative of Mayor Rodolfo H. Manalo to provide solution to the problem of students in going to a distant barangay to pursue secondary education. Transportation is the main factor which hinder learners will to pursue studies due to limited access of jeepney which most of the time its aggravated by the condition of muddy and rough roads during the rainy season.

In 2006 Mayor Manalo, planned to build a secondary school in this community so that transportation will no longer be a problem. This proposal came to the knowledge of Mr. & Mrs. Loreto M. Mendoza and because they feel the heartfelt sincerity of Hon. Mayor Manalo to bring education to the youth in the community they donated a piece of land.

Construction of the two classrooms began in April 2006 and started the school operation on June 5, 2006. Through the help of Mr. Florencio P. Ilao, Principal II of Buhaynasapa National High School, he himself got the special permit to operate in the Department of Education and to prepare pertinent supplies of the newly opened school.

The pioneer batch of the school came from barangays of Sampiro, Quipot, Sapangan, and even some barangays of Rosario. The total enrollees reach 90 students, 45 boys and 45 girls, with three teachers namely; Mrs. Margarita H. Delen, Ms. Ruvielyn B. Barcelona, and Ms. Leonilita M. Ferrer.

On June 14, 2008, Mr. Lemuel M. Dayo became Teacher In Charge of the school were computer education was introduced to the students even with only 3 computer units borrowed from Buhaynasapa NHS and 1 unit donated from the Provincial School Board.

High schools in Batangas